Revista Geográfica Española (abbreviated R Geog Esp.) was a Spanish language popular geographic magazine which was published in the period 1938–1977 in Spain. The magazine was a propaganda publication during the Franco rule.

History and profile
Revista Geográfica Española was modelled on National Geographic magazine and was launched by Valeriano Salas-Rodríguez in San Sebastián in May 1938 during the Spanish civil war. He also managed the magazine until his death in 1962 first in San Sebastián and from 1941 in Madrid. His assistant Aurelia Alonso replaced him as the manager of the magazine and remained in the post until the final issue, numbered 63, which was published in 1977. The magazine was published irregularly. Revista Geográfica Española was biannual until 1960 although sometimes it was published every four months per year. From 1961 the magazine was published annually until its demise in 1977.

Throughout the Franco rule the magazine was financed by different state institutions such as the general directorate of cultural relations and general directorate of tourism due to its propaganda based articles. Revista Geográfica Española mostly featured articles on the visits of Rodríguez to different parts of the world, including the United States, Cuba, Italy and the Near East. The regular contributors included Federico Sardá, Manuel Hernández-Sanjuán who also served as the editor-in-chief during the Salas period and Segismundo Pérez de Pedro.

References

1938 establishments in Spain
1977 disestablishments in Spain
Annual magazines
Biannual magazines
Defunct magazines published in Spain
Fascist newspapers and magazines
Former state media
Francoist Spain
Geographic magazines
Irregularly published magazines
Magazines established in 1938
Magazines disestablished in 1977
Magazines published in Madrid
Mass media in San Sebastián
Propaganda newspapers and magazines
Spanish-language magazines